Untermann is a German surname. Notable people with the surname include:

 Ernest Untermann (1864–1956), German-American socialist and writer
 Jürgen Untermann (1928–2013), German linguist and indoeuropeanist
 Matthias Untermann (born 1956), German art historian and medieval archaeologist

See also
Unterman

German-language surnames